Skyfire is an annual March fireworks show held over Lake Burley Griffin in Canberra, Australia since 1989. The event is funded by local radio station hit 104.7, and the display is synchronised to a soundtrack of music broadcast on the station.

History of the event

The first Skyfire was held on 18 March 1989, as FM 104.7's contribution to the Canberra Festival that year. 

Around 60,000 people attended the second Skyfire on 11 March 1990, which was put on at a cost of around A$100,000.
 
On 10 March 1991, Skyfire III saw more than 2.5 tonnes of fireworks launched into the sky for Canberra's viewing pleasure. 
 
In 1992, Skyfire was held on 8 March. It featured 3 tonnes of pyrotechnics and lasted for 35 minutes.

Skyfire V, on 7 March 1993, featured 436 separate shots, coordinated to music by artists including Madonna, Midnight Oil and Prince. The show used more than five tonnes of fireworks, launched from 10 pontoons floating in the middle of the lake. 

In 1994, Skyfire was held on 13 March and featured 6 tonnes of aerial and water fireworks worth almost A$250,000.

Skyfire X, on 8 March 1998, attracted an estimated 120,000 visitors. 

Skyfire XI, held on 7 March 1999, had grown to attract an estimated 180,000 visitors.

The 2006 Skyfire was held on 4 March, and called "Skyfire 18" because it was the eighteenth year of the fireworks. The day has become a large event with other activities including a display by the Roulettes aerobatic squadron and a performance by Lee Harding. There were around 35,000 individual fireworks used, with approximately 6,000 shooting comets and almost 3,000 shells.

More than 170,000 visitors turned out to see Skyfire 19 in 2007.

Skyfire 21 was held on 21 March 2009, with fireworks commencing at 8.33pm and lasting for 21 minutes. The firing zone was down the center basin of Lake Burley Griffin up to Anzac Parade and Parliament House down to Regatta Point. Fortunato Foti and a band of pyrotechnicians from Foti International Fireworks provided the show which was "at least 30 per cent bigger than the previous years," with "over 3,000 aerial fireworks, 15 to 20,000 shooting comets". One barge shot off a few more fireworks for 5–10 minutes after the show completed.

On 19 March 2011 around 80,000 people attended Skyfire. That year over 30 youths were taken into custody by police for underage drinking at the event. The following year, 130 police were employed to patrol Skyfire, and youth reception stations were set up at the event. 

The 2012 event featured more than 2,500 aerial fireworks.

Skyfire 25 in 2013 featured displays by the Royal Australian Navy (RAN), the Federation Guard and the Snowy Hydro Rescue Helicopter.

Skyfire in 2014 utilised around 3,000 individual cues and approximately eight kilometres of cabling.

Skyfire 2018 featured 40,000 pyrotechnic effects, 2,500 shells and 25,000 shooting comets. The firework display will start at 8:30pm with events at Regatta Point starting at 6:00pm including music, Federation Guard displays and a Royal Australian Air Force (RAAF) fast jet handling display.

Skyfire was cancelled in 2020, for the first time, due to the coronavirus pandemic in Australia. In November 2020, the 2021 show was also cancelled due to the pandemic.

Attendance and pyrotechnics by year

Sponsors
Skyfire is a hit104.7 Canberra event, with sponsorship over the years also offered by Casino Canberra, ActewAGL, and Canberra Airport.

References

External links
photos of Skyfire 2004

Events in Canberra
Festivals in Australian Capital Territory
Recurring events established in 1989
Festivals established in 1989
Fireworks events in Oceania